The men's college basketball program of the University of Pittsburgh was founded in 1905 and is known competitively as the Pitt Panthers. The team has had 16 head coaches in its history. There were no teams from 1908–1910.

Statistics updated through the end of the 2021–22 season

References

Pittsburgh

Pittsburgh Panthers basketball, men's, coaches